Siricilla Assembly constituency is a constituency of Telangana Legislative Assembly, India. Sircilla is a town and the district headquarters of Rajanna Sircilla district in the Indian state of Telangana.

Kalvakuntla Taraka Rama Rao, current working president of Telangana Rashtra Samithi is representing the constituency.

Mandals
The Assembly Constituency presently comprises the following Mandals:

Members of Legislative Assembly

Election results

Telangana Legislative Assembly election, 2018

Telangana Legislative Assembly election, 2014

Trivia
 Kalvakuntla Taraka Rama Rao set record as the first time won two consecutive general elections from Sircilla constituency.
 Regulapati Papa Rao is the first MLA for TRS, who quit Congress and joined TRS on May 9, 2001, within a fortnight of the party's founding by KCR. He was the party's only MLA for about 10 months.
 Freedom fighter and active member of Telangana Rebellion Chennamaneni Rajeshwar Rao was the five times winner of the constituency.

References

Assembly constituencies of Telangana
Rajanna Sircilla district